Ramón Guillermo Aveledo (born August 22, 1950) is a Venezuelan politician, academic, businessman, and columnist, and former Executive Secretary of the opposition electoral coalition Coalition for Democratic Unity. A former congressman, he was President of the Venezuelan Professional Baseball League from 2001 to 2007, and served under Luis Herrera Campins as Secretary of the Presidency (1979–1984). Author of over 30 books, he is Professor at the Universidad Metropolitana in Caracas. He was elected to the Venezuelan Chamber of Deputies three times, and served as its President twice. He is a columnist for Globovisión. He is a member of the board of the Rómulo Betancourt Foundation, and President of the Instituto de Estudios Parliamentarios Fermín Toro.

Selected bibliography
 El Llanero Solidario: Verdades ignoradas sobre Luis Herrera Campins y su tiempo (Editorial Libros Marcados, Caracas, 2012) – biography of Luis Herrera Campins
 El Dictador: Anatomía de la Tiranía (Editorial Libros Marcados, Caracas, 2008)
 El poder político en Venezuela (2007)

References

Living people
1950 births
Central University of Venezuela alumni
Venezuelan male writers
Copei politicians
People from Barquisimeto
Presidents of the Venezuelan Chamber of Deputies
20th-century Venezuelan lawyers
21st-century Venezuelan people
20th-century Venezuelan people